IC-26 (WIN 1161-3, Methiodone) is an analogue of the opioid analgesic methadone, where the carbonyl group has been replaced by the bioisosteric sulfone group.

Human and animal studies suggest that IC-26 is around the same potency as methadone, although other studies have found its activity to be inconsistent between different patients, with consistent opioid activity only being seen at a dose several times that of methadone. IC-26 was assessed for its abuse potential, but despite being found to have similar potential to methadone for development of dependence it was never placed under international control as an illegal drug.

See also
 Dextromoramide
 Dipipanone
 MT-45
 Phenadoxone

References

Synthetic opioids
Sulfones
Dimethylamino compounds
Mu-opioid receptor agonists
Benzhydryl compounds